Red Ace Squadron is a computer vehicle simulation game developed and published by Small Rockets in 2001. There is also an enhanced version named Red Ace Squadron Pro, which is an update to the game based on complaints and feedback from players. It is a sequel to the game Master of the Skies: The Red Ace. The game is compatible with 32-bit Windows systems from Windows 95b to Windows XP, although it is sometimes possible to run it in a 64-bit operating system (although with graphical and stability issues).

Gameplay 
The game takes place in World War I. There are 21 missions in total, with 10 having the player fight on the German side and 10 having him on the Allied side. A secret mission is also unlockable. Completing all singleplayer missions will unlock Master mode, in which the player faces a higher difficulty and numbers of enemies.

The game features 11 types of planes. Each faction has 4 types of planes that can be controlled by the player, with the Allied side sporting the Airco DH.2, the Sopwith Camel, the SPAD S.XIII, and the Nieuport 17, while the German side has the Halberstadt CL.II, the Junkers D.I, the Gotha G.V and the Fokker Dr.I. There are 3 types of aircraft in the game that the player is not able to control, those being the Albatros D.III, the Handley Page Type O and the Bristol Scout.

There are many different types of missions, including escorting allied units, bombing convoys and factories, dogfights and so on.

Pro Version 

A Pro version of Red Ace Squadron was released after a year of development. The main updates in the pro version are improved loading speeds, updated key bindings to get around Windows XP 'sticky keys' and improved documentation. Singleplayer mode now had 4 levels of difficulty to be chosen from, while multiplayer saw many new features, such as:

 Files are verified against the server - to stop cheating
 Servers can have a name and a game type name
 Server is configurable from inside the server program
 Server can be password protected
 Pick Up configuration
 Enable/disable Pick Ups
 Change how often a Pick Up appears
 Configure amount of ordinance a Pick Up gives you
 Pick Ups can be given to Players entering the arena
 Better GameSpy integration
 Will correctly show the number of players/active players/game type/name
 Game mode features displayed in game
 Change aircraft map visibility with 5 different modes
 Choose the map the game will start on
 Versioning - to stop clashes with different server/client versions
 Configure the number of players on a server
 Internet games can now have 8 players
 Server can display its IP address

Proposed sequel 
Jon Small had planned to launch the sequel to Red Ace Squadron in 2008, but the release date was delayed. The game was to feature a new graphics engine, multiplayer settings, as well as bigger and more detailed landscapes. It would also probably be designed to work on Windows 7. As usual, the game would be set in World War I. With the closing of Small Rockets in 2012, the game's development state is unknown, but is presumed to be halted.

Parallel to Red Ace Squadron 2, a second update for the original game was being developed, called Red Ace Squadron Pro2. Like in the original update, it was to be directed by community feedback.

References

External links 
Red Ace Squadron  
Red Ace Squadron Pro 
A fan website, barely sporting any content.

2001 video games
Video games developed in the United Kingdom
Windows games
Windows-only games
Flight simulation video games
World War I video games
Combat flight simulators